La Courneuve–8 mai 1945 is a station of the Paris Métro and serves as the northern terminus of Paris Métro Line 7.

History 
La Courneuve–8 mai 1945 was inaugurated on 6 May 1987 following an extension from Fort d'Aubervilliers and was renovated in 2005. The term "8 mai 1945" in its name refers to VE Day, or the end of World War II in Europe on 8 May 1945.

In 2019, the station was used by 5,886,507 passengers making it the 63rd busiest of the Métro network out of 302 stations.

In 2020, the station was used by 3,611,264 passengers amidst the COVID-19 pandemic, making it the 39th busiest of the Métro network out of 305 stations.

Passenger services

Access 
The station has 4 entrances:
 Access 1: Stade Daniel Féry
 Access 2: avenue Jean Jaurès
 Access 3: avenue Paul Vaillant Couturier
 Access 4: avenue Lénine

Station layout

Platforms 
The station has a particular arrangement specific to the stations serving or had served as a terminus. It has three tracks and two island platforms with its walls decorated with tiling depicting scenes of sunrises and sunsets at the seaside.

Other connections 
Since 6 July 1992, the station has been served by tramway T1, and before the extension to Gare de Saint-Denis on 15 December 1992, was its western terminus. From 2016 to the summer of 2017, the tram station was renovated along with the lengthening of the platforms and modernisation of its associated shelters to cater for the anticipated increase in traffic when further extensions to the line opens in Rueil-Malmaison and Fontenay-sous-Bois in the future.

It is also served by with bus lines 152 and 173 of the RATP bus network, by lines 607, 609, and 611 of the TRA bus network, and at night, by line N42 of the Noctilien bus network.

Tourism
Although it is not very tourist-oriented, the neighbourhood "Quatre routes" is very commercialized, featuring a large market which is open on Tuesdays, Fridays and Sunday mornings. To reach the nearby Parc départemental de La Courneuve, the largest green space in the département (approximately 4 km2), take the T1 to the station "Six routes". During the Fête de l'Humanité at the beginning of September, a shuttle takes people directly there from the terminus of the métro.

It is also possible to take the T1 towards Drancy in order to visit the deportation camp of the Cité de la Muette.

Bus 152 arrives at the station from the Musée de l'Air et de l'Espace (The Museum of Air and Space) at Le Bourget Airport, where a biennial aviation show is held.

Gallery

See also
 La Courneuve
 List of stations of the Paris Métro

References

External links

 Official site of the city of La Courneuve
 Official site of Le Parc de La Courneuve

Paris Métro line 7
Paris Métro stations in Seine-Saint-Denis
Railway stations in France opened in 1987